Donji Dragonožec is a village in Croatia.

Notable residents 

 Ante Pavlović

Populated places in the City of Zagreb